A sacrificial lamb is a metaphorical reference to a person or animal sacrificed for the common good. The term is derived from the traditions of Abrahamic religion where a lamb is a highly valued possession.

In politics

In politics, a sacrificial lamb candidate is a candidate chosen to contest an election with little chance of victory. The political party thus appoints the person as a sort of "sacrifice" to the stronger opponent.

In some cases, fielding a sacrificial lamb candidate can serve as an opportunity for the party to be more creative in choosing a candidate than would normally be considered acceptable in a closely contested race. Alan Keyes and Geraldine A. Ferraro are examples in American politics.  In 1956, Adlai Stevenson was considered a sacrificial lamb candidate for president against Dwight Eisenhower. In 2004, Howard Mills was considered a sacrificial lamb candidate for the U.S. Senate from New York against Chuck Schumer.

In the arts
In cinema and literature, the term sacrificial lamb refers to a supporting character whose sole dramatic purpose is to die, thus galvanizing the protagonist to action and simultaneously demonstrating how evil the villain is. Very often, the sacrificial lamb is a family member, partner, or "old buddy" of the protagonist, with whom he or she has an assumed intimacy, thus requiring no real character development. The term is almost always used critically, with the implication that the character was used transparently as a plot device.

An example of this in early literature is Macaria in Heracleidae by Euripides. A more modern example is Anthony Edwards' character Goose, in Top Gun as well as Phil Coulson in The Avengers.

See also
 Cadmean victory, in which a sacrificial lamb either loses a battle or dies but whose actions lead to a greater victory
 Cannon fodder, an expression used to denote the treatment of armed forces as a worthless commodity to be expended
 Dušni Brav
 Forlorn hope, the initial wave of troops attacking a fortress or other strongpoint, who usually took horrendous casualties
 Identified patient
 Korban Pesach, also known as the "Paschal Lamb"
 Kourbania
 Lamb of God, a direct reference to Jesus Christ who, in death, is traditionally considered to have played the role of a sacrificial lamb
 Redshirt (character), a stock character in science fiction whose sole purpose is to die violently soon after being introduced
 Scapegoat

References

Animal sacrifice
Biblical phrases
Metaphors referring to sheep or goats
Political metaphors referring to people
Religious terminology
Stock characters